Trevor Michael Brown (born 12 June 1979) is an Australian table tennis player. He competed in the men's singles event at the 2004 Summer Olympics.

References

External links
 

1979 births
Living people
Australian male table tennis players
Olympic table tennis players of Australia
Table tennis players at the 2004 Summer Olympics
Sportspeople from Melbourne
Sportsmen from Victoria (Australia)